Gun laws in Colorado regulate the sale, possession, and use of firearms and ammunition in the state of Colorado in the United States.

Summary table

Right to keep and bear arms in Colorado

An individual's right to keep and bear arms in Colorado is protected by both the Second Amendment to the United States Constitution and Article II, Section 13 of the Constitution of Colorado. The Second Amendment provides:
 

And Article II, Section 13 provides:

Colorado is one of only seven states which has a clause excluding concealed carry from its state right to bear arms provision. Two other states previously had an analogous clause in their constitution but have since removed it.

The government may regulate the exercise of the right to keep and bear arms protected by Article II, Section 13 under its inherent police power as long as the exercise of that power is "reasonable". However, Article II, Section 13 “does not tolerate government enactments that have either a purpose or effect of rendering the right to bear arms in self-defense a nullity.”

Open carry
Article II, Section 13 explicitly exempts the practice of carrying concealed weapons from its protection. Legal scholar David B. Kopel has observed, "[e]xpressly giving the government power over concealed bearing of arms means that the government does not have a similar power over openly bearing arms, or over keeping arms." As such, open carry is generally permitted in the state. However, local governments may prohibit open carry to a limited extent only in areas that are directly under the jurisdiction of the municipality such as municipal buildings, police stations, etc. If such an ordinance is written all locations affected must be posted per C.R.S 29-11.7-104. The exception is the city and county of Denver has done so in a broad sense banning open carry in all areas of the city and county.  The Colorado Supreme Court ruled that Denver's pre-existing ban may remain in force, despite the Colorado legislature's enactment of a statewide pre-emption law designed to establish uniform firearms policies across the state. When a rifle or shotgun is transported in a vehicle, there may not be a round in the chamber.

Concealed carry
The right to bear arms protected by Article II, Section 13 of the state constitution does not extend to concealed carry. However, the Colorado General Assembly has created a statutory right to concealed carry for legal residents who meet certain objective criteria. As such, Colorado is considered a "shall-issue" state.

Knowingly carrying a concealed firearm on or about one's person without a permit is a crime. A firearm is considered "concealed" when it is “placed out of sight so as not to be discernible or apparent by ordinary observation.” A firearm is considered "about the person" when it is “sufficiently close to the person to be readily accessible for immediate use.”

A concealed handgun permit is issued by the sheriff of the county where the applicant resides, and is valid for five years.  Applicants must demonstrate competence with a handgun, either by passing a training class or by other means. The Concealed Carry Act allows a person with a permit to carry a concealed weapon "in all areas of the state" with the exception of some federal properties, K-12 schools, and buildings with fixed security checkpoints such as courthouses, and also disallows a local government from enforcing an ordinance or resolution that conflicts with the law.

In March 2012, the Colorado Supreme Court struck down the University of Colorado's campus gun ban, saying it violated the Concealed Carry Act, which allows permit holders to carry on public property, including carrying on public colleges.

Criteria for obtaining a concealed handgun permit
To obtain a concealed handgun permit in Colorado, an applicant must:
 Be a legal resident of Colorado;
 Be at least 21 years old;
 Not be prohibited from possessing a firearm under state or federal law;
 Not have been convicted of perjury related to an application for a concealed handgun permit;
 Not be an alcoholic unless determined to be a recovering alcoholic by a licensed counselor and have not used alcohol for at least 3 years;
 Not be an unlawful user of or be addicted to a controlled substance;
 Not be subject to a protection order; and
 Have demonstrated competence with a handgun.

Even if an applicant meets all of these criteria, a sheriff may still deny the application, "if the sheriff has a reasonable belief that documented previous behavior by the applicant makes it likely the applicant will present a danger to self or others if the applicant receives a permit to carry." In practice, these discretionary denials are quite rare (e.g., there were 71 discretionary denials out of 75,504 applications in 2021). Nevertheless, giving sheriffs this kind of open-ended discretion to deny permits likely violates the Second Amendment.

Reciprocity with other states
Colorado will honor a valid concealed carry permit issued by another state if:
 The issuing state recognizes permits issued by Colorado;
 The permit holder is at least 21 years old; and
 The permit holder is a resident of the issuing state or has been a resident of Colorado for less than 90 days.

Colorado has established concealed carry reciprocity with 33 other states, namely: Alabama, Alaska, Arizona, Arkansas, Delaware, Florida, Georgia, Idaho, Iowa, Indiana, Kansas, Kentucky, Louisiana, Michigan, Mississippi, Missouri, Montana, Nebraska, New Hampshire, New Mexico, North Carolina, North Dakota, Ohio, Oklahoma, Pennsylvania, South Dakota, Tennessee, Texas, Utah, Virginia, West Virginia, Wisconsin and Wyoming. This includes every state that shares a border with Colorado.

Colorado has not established concealed carry reciprocity with 17 other states, namely: California, Connecticut, District of Columbia, Hawaii, Illinois, Maine, Maryland, Massachusetts, Minnesota, Nevada, New Jersey, New York, Oregon, Rhode Island, South Carolina, Vermont and Washington. The lack of reciprocity with these states is due to the fact that they do not honor Colorado permits. Minnesota, Nevada, and South Carolina do not honor Colorado permits because Colorado does not require live-fire training. In Maine and Vermont it is legal to carry a concealed weapon without a permit. The remaining 12 states do not honor permits from any other state.

Concealed handgun permit statistics
Sheriffs are required to prepare an annual report specifying the number applications received, the number of permits issued, the number of permits denied, the reasons for denial, the number of revocations, and the reasons for the revocations. In 2021, a total of 287,008 individuals held a valid concealed handgun permit, which is about 6.3% of the adult population. The fact that, in 2021, only about 0.06% of permits were revoked because of a permit holder's arrest record shows that permit holders are overwhelmingly law abiding citizens.

Magazine capacity limits
As of July 1, 2013, it is illegal to sell, transfer, or possess a magazine that is "capable of accepting, or that is designed to be readily converted to accept, more than fifteen rounds of ammunition." However, magazines owned before that date were grandfathered as long the owner has maintained continuous possession. This law is silent on non-residents visiting Colorado while in possession of large capacity magazines, provided they are for personal use, and the individual had lawfully obtained them according to the laws of his or her home state.

The enforceability of these restrictions is questionable, given that Colorado did not require grandfathered magazines to be registered with the state. Complicating matters, magazine manufacturers generally do not print serial numbers or a date of manufacture on the magazines they produce. Therefore, it would be virtually impossible to prove at trial that one illegally possessed an LCM unless someone witnessed that person obtaining or importing the illegal magazine. Gun stores have effectively found a way around this law by selling disassembled magazine parts kits.

Colorado Outfitters Ass'n v. Hickenlooper (2016)
A lawsuit over the legality of the magazine ban and background check laws was filed by 54 of the 64 elected county Sheriffs and 21 sporting and outdoor groups and Colorado companies. The suit alleged that the large-capacity magazine ban violated the Second and Fourteenth Amendments, and argued that the law would be impossible to enforce.

In Colorado Outfitters Ass'n v. Hickenlooper, 823 F.3d 537 (10th Cir. 2016), the Tenth Circuit held that the plaintiffs lacked standing to challenge the constitutionality of the state law banning magazines capable of holding more than 15 rounds on Second Amendment grounds.

Rocky Mountain Gun Owners v. Polis (2020)
In Rocky Mountain Gun Owners v. Polis, 467 P.3d 314 (Colo. 2020), the Colorado Supreme Court held that the state law banning magazines capable of holding more than 15 rounds did not violate Article II, Section 13 of the Colorado Constitution. The plaintiffs did not challenge the law on Second Amendment grounds.

Universal background checks
Effective July 1, 2013, Colorado requires background checks for all firearm sales at the buyer's expense. Without exception, all transferees must complete a background check before they can obtain a firearm from a licensed gun dealer. Transferees must also complete a background check in order to obtain a firearm from a private individual. However, this does not apply to bona fide gifts or loans between immediate family members, transfers that occur by operation of law, temporary transfers that occur while in the home of a transferee who is not a prohibited person and reasonably fears imminent death or serious bodily injury, temporary transfers for target shooting or hunting, temporary transfers for repair or maintenance, temporary transfers that occur in the continuous presence of the owner, and temporary transfers for not more than seventy-two hours.

Restricted weapon types
Colorado imposes criminal penalties only when individuals manufacture, possess, or sell machine guns in violation of federal law.

Second Amendment sanctuaries
As of 2020, 39 of Colorado's 64 counties (60%) have passed resolutions declaring themselves to be "Second Amendment sanctuaries", namely: Alamosa, Archuleta, Baca, Bent, Cheyenne, Conejos, Crowley, Custer, Delta, Dolores, Douglas, El Paso, Elbert, Fremont, Garfield, Huerfano, Jackson, Kiowa, Kit Carson, Lincoln, Logan, Mesa, Mineral, Moffat, Montezuma, Montrose, Otero, Park, Phillips, Prowers, Rio Blanco, Rio Grande, Sedgwick, Teller, Washington, Weld, and Yuma. Most of these counties did so in response to the red flag law that was adopted on April 12, 2019 and went into effect on January 1, 2020.

Preemption
From 2003 to 2021, Colorado had state preemption of local firearm laws, except for certain ordinances enacted by the City and County of Denver. The statewide firearm preemption law was repealed in 2021, allowing cities and counties to enact firearms ordinances that are more restrictive than state law. Denver has enacted local firearms ordinances that are more restrictive than state law, and other cities (notably Boulder) are considering additional local firearm restrictions. Meanwhile, a growing number of rural counties are using the repeal of Colorado's statewide firearm pre-emption law as the basis for their refusal to enforce portions of the state's firearm laws (notably Colorado's red flag law) within their jurisdictions.

Concealed carry permits remain valid statewide, despite the repeal of statewide pre-emption. In other words, local jurisdictions cannot completely ban concealed carry by permit-holders within their jurisdictions, although they may restrict concealed carry by permit holders in public buildings and parks, or in designated areas when special events or large public gatherings are held. However, local jurisdictions may enact ordinances restricting or outlawing open carry (which requires no permit in Colorado) within their boundaries, and the City and County of Denver has done so.

Boulder
The City of Boulder unanimously passed 6 new gun control ordinances in June 2022. These measures were drafted with the assistance of the Giffords Law Center to Prevent Gun Violence and Everytown for Gun Safety.

Boulder County
Boulder County adopted new gun control measures on August 2, 2022.

Denver
Denver law bans assault weapons and the open carry of firearms. In 2003, the Colorado General Assembly passed laws preempting these and several other pre-existing Denver laws, which Denver successfully challenged in Denver District Court in 2004. In 2006, the Colorado Supreme Court let stand the District Court order upholding the Denver laws. In 2022, Denver City Council bans concealed carry guns in all city's properties.

Louisville
The City of Louisville adopted new gun control measures on July 7, 2022.

Superior
The Town of Superior adopted new gun control measures in June 2022.

See also
 Law of Colorado
 Government of Denver

References

Colorado law
Colorado